Hechtia montana is a species of plant in the genus Hechtia. This species is endemic to Mexico.

The Latin specific epithet montana refers to mountains or coming from mountains.

The plant is used as a traditional food source in Sonora, Mexico; the Guarijío call it hichiconi and roast the rosettes, eating them much like an artichoke, while the Tarahumara are said to give it the name chikani and eat the leaves raw year-round.

References

montana
Flora of Mexico